University Health Network (UHN) is a public research and teaching hospital network in Toronto, Ontario, Canada. It is the largest health research organization in Canada and ranks first in Canada for total research funding.  It was named Canada's top research hospital by Research Infosource from 2015 to 2022. The network includes three acute care hospitals – Toronto General Hospital, Toronto Western Hospital, Princess Margaret Cancer Centre – the Toronto Rehabilitation Institute, and The Michener Institute, a post-secondary institution granting diplomas and certificates in health sciences and leadership. In the 2019-2020 fiscal year, there were over 39,000 acute inpatient stays and close to 121,000 emergency department visits across the three acute care hospitals.

History

A series of mergers over many years has resulted in the UHN in its current form. In 1986, the Toronto Western Hospital and the Toronto General Hospital merged to form The Toronto Hospital. This was followed in 1998 when the Princess Margaret Cancer Centre united, with the resultant institution named the University Health Network in 1999. The Toronto Rehabilitation Institute joined in 2011, facilitating rehabilitation services for patients as they transitioned out of acute care. All four hospitals are affiliated with the Faculty of Medicine at the University of Toronto and serve as teaching hospitals for resident physicians, nurses, and other healthcare professions. 2016 saw the integration of The Michener Institute into the UHN. The Michener Institute for Education was originally established in 1958 and is the first non-medical unit to join the UHN.

Programs 
UHN and Sinai Health System jointly run the SHS-UHN Antimicrobial Stewardship Program, advocating for improved patient access to appropriate antibiotics while combating antimicrobial resistance. The program is led by infectious diseases specialist Andrew Morris, who joined as founding Director at its inception in 2009.

During the COVID-19 pandemic, UHN received a $323,981 grant from the Public Health Agency of Canada's Immunization Partnership Fund to increase COVID-19 vaccine uptake among personal support workers and their patients.

References

Hospital networks in Canada
1999 establishments in Ontario